Little Knights Tale is a 2009 Czech comedy film directed by Karel Janák. It was shown at the 2011 Berlin International Film Festival.

Cast
Pavel Kříž as Albrecht z Krvenos
David Prachař as Martin z Vamberka
Dany Mesároš as Petr
Ivana Korolová as Tereza
Jan Komínek as Vítek
Štěpán Krtička as Michal
Andrea Žádníková as Katerina
Tereza Voříšková as Jana
Matěj Hádek as Ruprecht
Martin Písařík as Varvar
Michael Beran as Ignác
Jan Battěk as Adam
Predrag Bjelac as Ahmed
Hynek Čermák as Albrechtuv Velitel
Ota Jirák as Hynek

References

External links
 Ať žijí rytíři! at csfd.cz
 Ať žijí rytíři! at kinobox.cz
 

2009 comedy films
2009 films
2000s Czech-language films
2000s adventure comedy films
Czech adventure comedy films
2000s Czech films